Coleophora almeriensis is a moth of the family Coleophoridae. It is found in Spain.

References

almeriensis
Moths described in 1999
Moths of Europe